Ty Daniel Parten (born October 13, 1969) is a former professional American football defensive lineman in the National Football League. After playing college football for the Arizona Wildcats, Parten was drafted by the Cincinnati Bengals in the 3rd round (63rd overall) of the 1993 NFL Draft. He played seven seasons for the Bengals (1993–1995) and the Kansas City Chiefs (1997–2000).

References

External links
 Just Sports Stats

1969 births
Living people
Players of American football from Washington, D.C.
Players of American football from Scottsdale, Arizona
American football defensive linemen
Arizona Wildcats football players
Cincinnati Bengals players
Scottish Claymores players
Kansas City Chiefs players
Las Vegas Outlaws (XFL) players